Petasin is a natural chemical compound found in plants of the genus Petasites.  Chemically, it is classified as a sesquiterpene and is the ester of petasol and angelic acid.

Petasin is believed to be responsible, at least in part, for the anti-inflammatory effects of Common Butterbur (Petasites hybridus) extracts.

Recent study has proven that Petasin can inhibit the tumor growth and metastasis in cancer patients.

References

Sesquiterpenes
Carboxylate esters